Omotayo is a given name of Nigerian origin, meaning "child that brings joy". Notable people with the given name include:
 
Tayo Adaramola (born 2003), real name Omotayo Adaramola, Irish footballer
Omotayo Akinremi (born 1974), Nigerian former sprinter and hurdler
Tayo Alasoadura (born 1949), real name Omotayo Alasoadura, Nigerian politician
Omotayo Oduntan (born 1957), Nigerian politician

See also
Abolaji Omotayo Oluwaseun (born 1998), Nigerian sprinter
Gold Omotayo (born 1994), Swiss professional footballer
Olajide Omotayo (born 1995), Nigerian professional table tennis player